Juan Fuse (born February 21, 1905, death date unknown) represented Argentina at the 1948 Summer Olympics in London. He competed in the hammer throw, finishing 20th.

His personal best is 52.67m in 1940.

References

1905 births
Year of death missing
Argentine male hammer throwers
Olympic athletes of Argentina
Athletes (track and field) at the 1948 Summer Olympics
Pan American Games competitors for Argentina
Athletes (track and field) at the 1951 Pan American Games
People from Junín, Buenos Aires
Sportspeople from Buenos Aires Province
20th-century Argentine people